Qufu Normal University is a public university located in the cities of Qufu, which is the ancient home of Confucius, and in Rizhao, Shandong province, China. Its focal points include studies of history, calligraphy, law, management, chemistry, physics and the general education of teachers.

History
The history of the university dates to 1955, when Shandong Teachers College was founded in Jinan. In September, 1956 the institution moved to Qufu, renaming itself Qufu Teachers College. In 1970 it was absorbed into Shandong University and, after four years, the college became was again revived as Qufu Teachers College. The current name was adopted along with the university status in 1985. The Rizhao Campus was founded in 2002.

Administration
The faculties are split between the two campuses, with both having a share in both social and technical sciences. Western languages are taught in Qufu, while Rizhao hosts the Asian languages, with English majors available at both locations. The university offers five first level and 31 second level doctoral programs, 22 first level and 115 second level master programs and 84 undergraduate programs including arts, science and engineering and law. There are 28 colleges or departments.

The university covers 3061 acres, the total assets is 1.312 billion yuan, of which teaching and research equipment worth 239 million yuan.

Faculties in Qufu
College of Liberal Arts
College of History and Culture
College of Foreign Languages
College of Pedagogy
School of Vocational and Continuing Education
College of Mathematics and Science
College of Physics and Engineering
School of Chemistry and Chemical Engineering
College of Life Sciences
School of Sports Science
Calligraphy Department
School of Marxism
International Exchange College

Faculties in Rizhao
College of Politics and Public Administration 
School of Economics
Law School
School of Information Science and Engineering
 College of Geography
College of Translation Studies
College of Engineering
Academy of Fine Arts
School of Statistics
School of Communication
School of Software Engineering
College of Music
School of Management

References

External links
 

Universities and colleges in Shandong
Teachers colleges in China
Qufu
Rizhao
1955 establishments in China
Educational institutions established in 1955